Yodogawa (written: 淀川) is a Japanese surname. Notable people with the surname include:

, Japanese film critic and television personality
, Japanese footballer

See also
 Yodogawa-ku, Osaka, Japan
 The Yodo River in Japan

Japanese-language surnames